Dwayne Plummer (born 12 May 1978) is an English former professional football forward. He featured in a Paul Gascoigne skills video as a youngster. He has also represented the Cayman Islands in a 5–0 friendly defeat to American club side D.C. United, but he never played for them in a full international after FIFA ruled that he did not meet eligibility requirements.

Playing career
Plummer began his career as a trainee with Bristol City, turning professional in September 1995. He joined Stevenage Borough in November 1998 on a free transfer, after initially being on loan.

He then played for Chesham United before joining Bristol Rovers in September 2000. Later that month he scored the winning penalty as Rovers put Premiership Everton out of the League Cup. His time with Rovers was disrupted by injuries, and he left in September 2002 when his contract was terminated for 'gross misconduct' involving an 'incident at a gym'. He had a few months without a club before joining Harlow Town in January 2003. Later that month he joined Gravesend & Northfleet, but was released after just one substitute appearance, a 2–1 defeat at home to Margate.

He joined Aylesbury United, from where he joined Bath City in September 2003, having been with the club since pre-season. He played six times, all as a substitute, before leaving following a disagreement with the Bath fans during the defeat away to Thame United in the FA Cup. Plummer joined Crawley Town in November 2003, but left the following January. He joined Hendon, making his debut against Crawley on 17 January, before joining Thurrock in June 2004.

He joined Kingstonian in December 2004, before joining Staines Town in the 2005 close-season. He was a regular in the Staines side, but left to join AFC Wimbledon in October 2005, having broken his nose in his final game for Staines. He joined Braintree Town in June 2006, but missed the first six games of the season having been sent off while at Wimbledon, a fact he failed to inform the Braintree manager George Borg until the last minute.

Plummer joined Boreham Wood in February 2007, and joined Carshalton Athletic in February 2008.

His younger brother Tristan played for Bristol City.

References

External links

1978 births
Living people
Footballers from Bristol
English footballers
Association football forwards
Bristol City F.C. players
Stevenage F.C. players
Chesham United F.C. players
Bristol Rovers F.C. players
Harlow Town F.C. players
Ebbsfleet United F.C. players
Aylesbury United F.C. players
Bath City F.C. players
Crawley Town F.C. players
Hendon F.C. players
Thurrock F.C. players
Kingstonian F.C. players
Staines Town F.C. players
AFC Wimbledon players
Braintree Town F.C. players
Boreham Wood F.C. players
East Thurrock United F.C. players
Carshalton Athletic F.C. players
Maldon & Tiptree F.C. players
Arnett Gardens F.C. players
FC Reno players
English Football League players
Isthmian League players
Southern Football League players
National League (English football) players